David DeGrazia (born July 20, 1962) is an American moral philosopher specializing in bioethics and animal ethics. He is Professor of Philosophy at George Washington University, where he has taught since 1989, and the author or editor of several books on ethics, including Taking Animals Seriously: Mental Life and Moral Status (1996), Human Identity and Bioethics (2005), and Creation Ethics: Reproduction, Genetics, and Quality of Life (2012).

Selected publications

Books
Creation Ethics: Reproduction, Genetics, and Quality of Life. Oxford University Press, 2012.
Human Identity and Bioethics. Cambridge University Press, 2005.
Animal Rights: A Very Short Introduction. Oxford University Press, 2002.
with Thomas Mappes and Jeffrey Brand-Ballard (eds.). Biomedical Ethics. McGraw-Hill, 2011.
Taking Animals Seriously: Mental Life and Moral Status. Cambridge University Press, 1996.
with Thomas Mappes and Jane Zembaty (eds.). Social Ethics: Morality and Social Policy. McGraw-Hill, 2012.
with Lester Hunt. Debating Gun Control. Oxford University Press, 2016.
with Tom Beauchamp. Principles of Animal Research Ethics. Oxford University Press, 2020.
with Joseph Millum. A Theory of Bioethics. Cambridge University Press, 2021.

Articles
DeGrazia, David. "Procreative Responsibility in View of What Parents Owe Their Children." In Leslie Francis (ed.), The Oxford Handbook of Reproductive Ethics (New York: Oxford University Press, 2017).
DeGrazia, David, Michelle Groman, and Lisa Lee. "Defining the Boundaries of a Right to Adequate Protection: A New Lens on Pediatric Research Ethics." Journal of Medicine and Philosophy (2017)
DeGrazia, David. "The Case for Moderate Gun Control." Kennedy Institute of Ethics Journal 24 (2014): 1-25.
DeGrazia, David. "What is Suffering and What Kinds of Beings Can Suffer?" In Ronald Green and Nathan Palpant (eds.), Suffering in Bioethics (New York: Oxford University Press, 2014).
DeGrazia, David. "Moral Enhancement, Freedom, and What We (Should) Value in Moral Behavior." Journal of Medical Ethics 39 (2013): 1-8. 
DeGrazia, David. "Moral Vegetarianism from a Very Broad Basis." Journal of Moral Philosophy 6, no. 2 (2009): 143-165. 
DeGrazia, David. "Self-Awareness in Animals." In Robert Lurz (ed.), The Philosophy of Animal Minds (Cambridge University Press, 2009): 201-217.
DeGrazia, David. "Single Payer Meets Managed Competition: The Case for Public Funding and Private Delivery." Hastings Center Report 38, no. 1 (2008): 23-33.
DeGrazia, David. "The Harm of Death, Time-Relative Interests, and Abortion." Philosophical Forum 57 (2007): 57-80.
DeGrazia, David. "Moral Status, Human Identity, and Early Embryos: A Critique of the President's Approach." Journal of Law, Medicine & Ethics 34 (Spring 2006): 49-57. 
DeGrazia, David. "Prozac, Enhancement, and Self-Creation." Hastings Center Report 30, no. 2 (March–April 2000): 34-40.
DeGrazia, David. "Wittgenstein and the Mental Life of Animals", History of Philosophy Quarterly 11, no. 1 (January 1994): 121–137.
DeGrazia, David. "Moving Forward in Bioethical Theory: Theories, Cases, and Specified Principlism," Journal of Medicine and Philosophy 17 (1992): 511-39.  
DeGrazia, David, and Andrew Rowan. "Pain, Suffering, and Anxiety in Animals and Humans." Theoretical Medicine 12 (1991): 193-211.

See also
 List of animal rights advocates

Notes

Further reading
Clark, Stephen. "Review: Taking Animals Seriously: Mental Life and Moral Status by David DeGrazia", The Philosophical Quarterly 49, no. 195 (April 1999): 246–247.
Schechtman, Marya. "Review: David DeGrazia, Human Identity and Bioethics", Ethics 116, no. 2 (January 2006): 406–409.
Steinbock, Bonnie. "Review: Creation Ethics: Reproduction, Genetics, and Quality of Life by David DeGrazia. Notre Dame Philosophical Reviews, August 21, 2012.

1962 births
Living people
20th-century American philosophers
21st-century American philosophers
American animal rights scholars
Animal ethicists
Bioethicists
George Washington University faculty
Georgetown University alumni
Philosophers of death